The Pretoria Armour Regiment (formerly the Pretoria Regiment) is a reserve armoured regiment of the South African Army.

History

Origin
The regiment was formed in Pretoria on 1 July 1913 as the 12th Infantry (Pretoria Regiment) – a unit of the Active Citizen Force – by the amalgamation of several units: the Pretoria Company of the Transvaal Scottish, the Central South African Railway Volunteers, the Northern Mounted Rifles and the Pretoria detachment of the Transvaal Cycle and Motor Corps.

World War One
The Regiment landed from the sea and served in German South West Africa at Aus and Tschaukaib in the south. They were part of the advance on Tsumeb in July 1915.

Rand Revolt
The regiment prevented a force of armed strikers from damaging the Pretoria-Germiston Railway line in May 1922.

Renamed
In 1928, it was renamed the Pretoria Regiment.

The Royal Colonel
On 24 October 1930 it was once again renamed, to the Pretoria Regiment (Princess Alice's Own) after Princess Alice, Countess of Athlone. The Regiment became fully bilingual with the addition of a 2nd Battalion staffed predominantly by Afrikaners.

World War Two
During World War II, the Regiment was converted to an armoured formation attached to the 11th South African Armoured Brigade, South African 6th Armoured Division. The unit was demobilised after the war, and in 1946 it was re-organised as a part-time force, consisting of two separate regiment-sized formations. These were re-integrated in 1954.

Renamed again
After the establishment of the Republic of South Africa on 31 May 1961, the unit was again renamed Pretoria Regiment by the South African Defence Force. In the 1960s, recruits were trained on Centurion tanks and the new Eland armoured cars. The regiment assisted in the development of the Olifant MBT.

Border War
The regiment was placed under the command of the 8th Armoured Division (South Africa) in this period.

The regiment saw service in the Border War in operations such as Operation Prone.

One squadron of the regiments tanks was attached to 61 Mechanised Battalion Group for operations near Cuito Cuanavale sustaining no personnel or vehicle casualties.

SANDF era

Name Change
In August 2019, 52 Reserve Force units had their names changed to reflect the diverse military history of South Africa. The Pretoria Regiment became the Pretoria Armour Regiment, and have 3 years to design and implement new regimental insignia. Unlike others it was only a confirmation of the regiment's armoured role.

Equipment

Insignia and honours

Regimental Symbols
Badges: An impala on a mountain representing the Magaliesberg range to north of Pretoria, with in the foreground some succulents. Beneath the impala and the mountain is a ribbon bearing the regiment's motto, Nulli Secundus ("Second to None"). This motto was granted to the regiment by the then Prime Minister Louis Botha after the 1914 – 1915 campaign.

Previous dress insignia

An unusual backing appeared on the regiment's cap badge around 1945 when it was associated with a British unit, the 24th Guards Brigade, when they were both part of the 6th South African Armoured Division. The two units had fought side by side on the Italian Front and ended their association by celebrating their co-operation; the 24th Guards Brigade gave their arm badge as a present to the unit. The two wings are therefore those depicted on the Guards Brigade arm patch.

The regiment has been allied with The Royal Welsh Fusiliers since 1995 (as it was previously from 1927 to 1961).

Divisional Affiliation
 8 South African Armoured Division
 81 Armoured Brigade

Alliances
 – The Royal Welsh

Battle honours

Official mascot

During the Second World War, the sole Class 21 2-10-4 Texas type locomotive of the South African Railways (SAR) was often used to haul long and heavy military trains, troop trains and sometimes Italian prisoners-of-war to the military unit and prisoner-of-war camp at Sonderwater near Cullinan. In the process it was made the official mascot of the  military unit in Pretoria, the Pretoria Regiment (Princess Alice's Own). The  was the only SAR locomotive to be honoured in this way by the armed forces.

Leadership

References

Armoured regiments of South Africa
Military units and formations in Pretoria
Military units and formations established in 1913
Military units and formations of South Africa in World War I
Military units and formations of South Africa in World War II
Military units and formations of South Africa in the Border War
1913 establishments in South Africa